These are the official results of the Men's Decathlon competition at the 1991 World Championships in Tokyo, Japan. There were a total number of 27 participating athletes, excluding three non-starters, and the competition starting on Thursday August 29, 1991, and ending on Friday August 30, 1991.

Medalists

Schedule

Thursday, August 29

Friday, August 30

Records

Final standings

See also
 1988 Men's Olympic Decathlon
 1990 Men's European Championships Decathlon
 1991 Hypo-Meeting
 1991 Decathlon Year Ranking
 1992 Men's Olympic Decathlon

References
 Results

D
Decathlon at the World Athletics Championships